Magdalenasaura leurosquama is a species of lizard in the family Gymnophthalmidae. It is endemic to Antioquia, Colombia.

References

Magdalenasaura
Reptiles of Colombia
Endemic fauna of Colombia
Reptiles described in 2020